The spider tortoise (Pyxis arachnoides) is a species of tortoise in the family Testudinidae that is endemic to Madagascar and is one of only two species in the genus Pyxis.

Habitat
The remaining tortoises are found only in south western Madagascar, where they inhabit the spiny vegetation of the sandy coastal areas.

Life cycle and breeding
Very little is known about the life cycle of this endangered tortoise, which is believed to live for up to 70 years. Here they feed on young leaves, insect larvae, and even the droppings of larger animals. When the wet season arrives, the dormancy period ends and the tortoises begin to mate. Females only lay one egg when they reproduce, and the egg is incubated for about 220–250 days.

Conservation
Their trade is illegal in Madagascar, but they are extensively smuggled for food, body parts, and illegal pets.

References

Turtles of Africa
Reptiles of Madagascar
Endemic fauna of Madagascar
Pyxis (genus)
Reptiles as pets
Reptiles described in 1827
Species endangered by the pet trade
Taxonomy articles created by Polbot
Madagascar spiny thickets